National Highways traffic officers, previously Highways Agency traffic officer (HATO), are employees of National Highways.

In April 2004, Highways Agency traffic officers began working alongside police on motorways in the West Midlands. The national roll-out of traffic officers was completed on 18 July 2006, and they now cover all of the motorway network within England, i.e. that which is owned or managed by National Highways, and some of the all-purpose trunk road (APTR) network.

On 1 April 2015 the Highways Agency became Highways England, a government-owned company. On 19 August 2021, Highways England was renamed to National Highways, however the company only manages roads in England.

Traffic operations play a significant role in achieving National Highways's three imperatives of safety, customer service and delivery. Traffic officers help to keep the roads moving and road users safe. They provide customer service every day of the year and assist with the delivery of schemes and projects, providing key services such as rolling road block. This is achieved through the planning and delivery of operational services, the function undertaken by on-road traffic officers, the management of the network from National Highways's control centres, the services National Highways supplies to the public, and its national incident liaison role. This aim is underpinned by legislative and regulatory requirements, the Network Operations Partnership Agreement and the National Guidance Framework agreed with the National Police Chiefs' Council.

Operations

Patrols
While patrols were initially always crewed by two traffic officers, following a successful trial in 2013, all traffic officers are to be trained in the near future to operate singly crewed, increasing the potential reach of the service. Traffic officers wear high-visibility jackets, distinctive by the orange and yellow markings. All staff who work on the network are required to wear protective equipment such as safety boots, gloves and safety goggles. Staff have the option to wear a white collared shirt and tie, an open necked white shirt or a navy collared polo shirt. All officers carry  portable Airwave radios.

Vehicles and equipment
Traffic officers patrol the motorway network  and all-purpose trunk roads in high-visibility patrol vehicles that feature black and yellow Battenburg liveries, and amber and red rear-facing lighting. The vehicles have all-wheel drive capabilities and are used to assist in the management of incidents and, where appropriate, clear broken-down or disabled vehicles to places of safety off the carriageways. The vehicles can operate in severe weather and carry equipment including emergency traffic management kits, automated external defibrillators (AED), and other specialised equipment required to safely remove vehicles and deal with a range of different incidents. The combination of the vehicles' size, liveries and ancillary lighting enhances their visibility when positioned at incidents. They are also fitted with Airwave radios, hands-free mobile telephones, alternating flashing headlights and bull horns to assist with progressing through stationary traffic on approach to incidents. They also have variable message panels (VMP) in the rear windows which display messages such as "do not pass" for rolling roadblocks or scrolling "keep left and right" chevrons for use at incidents.

When travelling on the hard shoulders, vehicles use front- and rear-facing amber lighting, and are restricted to 20 mph. When stationary on the hard shoulder, vehicles illuminate rear-facing amber LEDs. However, when the vehicle is working in the carriageway all the rear-facing lights (amber and red) are displayed to warn approaching traffic. Traffic officers, unlike police, must comply with all speed limits, including temporary mandatory limits in roadworks.

While stationary on the hard shoulder and if a traffic officer feels it is necessary – because of the weather, location or road layout – they may use the rear red lights, in addition to the amber lights. This will be noted in the traffic officer's pocket notebook as a dynamic risk assessment and also relayed to a regional control centre (RCC) for entry onto the log.

The traffic officers use different models of 4×4 vehicles, with a mixed fleet of plug-in hybrid electric vehicles (PHEV) and diesel-powered with automatic transmissions. Vehicles used for patrolling as of 2021 include Land Rover Discovery, Mitsubishi Shogun, Mitsubishi Shogun Sport, Volvo XC90 (PHEV) and BMW X5 (PHEV).

Communications
Traffic officers maintain contact with each other and the regional operational control centres by use of Sepura hand-held and vehicle TETRA radios using the Airwave network, and enabling officers to co-ordinate with other Airwave users. Each patrol vehicle is also fitted with a hands-free mobile phone.

Incidents
Traffic officers attend incidents ranging from breakdowns and road debris to road traffic collisions (RTCs) taking the lead command role, except where there is an incident involving loss of life, life-changing injuries or potential criminal activity.

Traffic officers patrol  of the road network, and in 2017 the total number of incidents attended was 230,122.

Powers
Traffic officers principally derive powers from the Traffic Management Act 2004 and have jurisdiction over the strategic road network of England, under authorisation given by the secretary of state.

Traffic Management Act 2004

Traffic officers must comply with the directions of a police constable, and to exercise their powers must be on duty and in uniform.

For the purposes of:
maintaining or improving the movement of traffic on a relevant road over which the traffic officer has jurisdiction
preventing or reducing the effect of anything causing (or which has the potential to cause) congestion or other disruption to the movement of traffic on such a road
avoiding danger to persons or other traffic using such a road (or preventing risks of any such danger arising)
preventing damage to, or to anything on or near, such a road

a traffic officer may:
direct a person driving or propelling a vehicle to stop the vehicle, or to make it proceed in, or keep to, a particular line of traffic
for the purposes of a traffic survey of any description which is being carried out on or in the vicinity of a road, to direct a person driving or propelling a vehicle to stop the vehicle, or to make it proceed in, or keep to, a particular line of traffic, or to proceed to a particular point on or near the road on which the vehicle is being driven or propelled (subject to the restriction in section 35(3) of the Road Traffic Act 1988 (c. 52))
when regulating vehicular traffic in a road, direct persons on foot (or such persons and other traffic) to stop
direct a person driving a mechanically propelled vehicle, or riding a cycle, on a road to stop the vehicle or cycle
place and temporarily maintain traffic signs on a road
remove and dispose of vehicles in line with the Removal and Disposal of Vehicles (Traffic Officers) (England) Regulations 2008

Assaulting, resisting or wilfully obstructing a traffic officer in the execution of their duties is an offence. It is also an offence to impersonate a traffic officer, or for a traffic officer to claim to have more powers than they do. National Highways traffic officers do not have any powers of detention, or to search, issue fixed penalties or report for summons for any motoring offence. Breaching a rolling road block is an offence which is likely to be prosecuted. The number of prosecutions has increased as traffic officer vehicles are now fitted with CCTV, allowing enhanced records to be made of incident management and for evidential purposes when required.

Drivers are obliged by the Traffic Management Act 2004 to comply with directions given by officers; this is briefly explained in the Highway Code:

Removal and disposal of vehicles
Since 2008, traffic officers have had the powers to directly arrange recovery of abandoned, broken-down or damaged vehicles. Previously this had been arranged through local police forces. The use of recovery powers is in accordance with strict guidance and instructions.

National Highways has its own national recovery contract used by traffic officers when removing vehicles on a statutory basis. Since October 2013, this service has been delivered by FMG Support, who are appointed as the National Vehicle Recovery Manager. FMG Support work via a national network of recovery operators, who are instructed to recover individual vehicles.

The powers to allow traffic officers to remove vehicles are detailed in The Removal and Disposal of Vehicles (Traffic Officers) (England) Regulations 2008.

Vehicles that are in a dangerous location or causing an obstruction can be removed at any time under Section 99 of the Road Traffic Regulation Act 1984; in other cases motorists have two hours to make arrangements for recovery. Where they cannot make suitable arrangements in this time, under Section 99 a "statutory removal", subject to strict controls, can be invoked.

Regional operations centres

There are seven regional operational control centres  (formerly known as regional control centres) located across England which function as the daily operations control rooms.

Control centres answer the orange emergency roadside telephones on the motorway and trunk road network, liaise with breakdown organisations, allocate traffic officers to incidents, monitor the CCTV system, control the electronic variable-message signs on the roads and supply information to the NTCC. Some RCCs are co-located with the police.

References

External links 
 National Highways YouTube channel

Road transport in England
Emergency road services